Sir James Douglas Wishart Thomson, 2nd Baronet (30 October 1905 – 3 January 1972) was a Scottish Unionist politician.

Thomson was the son of Sir Frederick Thomson, 1st Baronet and was educated at Oxford University. He was a member of the Oxford crews in the 1926 and 1927 Boat Race.

Thomson was elected as member of parliament (MP) for Aberdeen South at a by-election in May 1935 following the death of his father, who had held the seat for the Conservative party and from whom he also inherited the baronetcy. He held the seat until he "resigned" on 4 November 1946 by taking the Chiltern Hundreds.

He is buried with his parents in the north-east corner of Dean Cemetery in Edinburgh.

See also
List of Oxford University Boat Race crews

References

External links
 

1905 births
1972 deaths
Baronets in the Baronetage of the United Kingdom
Oxford University Boat Club rowers
Unionist Party (Scotland) MPs
Members of the Parliament of the United Kingdom for Scottish constituencies
UK MPs 1935–1945
UK MPs 1945–1950
Members of the Parliament of the United Kingdom for Aberdeen constituencies